Picton Castle is a medieval castle near Haverfordwest in the community of Uzmaston, Boulston and Slebech, Pembrokeshire, Wales. Originally built at the end of the 13th century by a Flemish knight, it later came into the hands of Sir John Wogan. The castle and estate are now run by the Picton Castle Trust, a registered charity, and are no longer occupied by Wogan's descendants, the Philipps family (see Baron Milford and Viscount St Davids). It is of unusual construction and has been remodelled several times during its history. The castle is a Grade I listed building and its gardens and park are designated at Grade II* on the Cadw/ICOMOS Register of Parks and Gardens of Special Historic Interest in Wales.

History
Until the late eleventh century, this part of southwestern Wales was part of the Welsh kingdom of Deheubarth. After the death in 1093 of the king of Deheubarth, Rhys ap Tewdwr, in the Battle of Brecon, the Normans took advantage of the lack of leadership among the Welsh, and Norman forces seized much of South Wales. In 1102, following a failed revolt by many of these Normans against King Henry I of England (in favour of Henry's brother, Robert Curthose), the King re-organised the wider region surrounding the Daugleddau Estuary and Milford Haven, including the Penfro peninsula, as a single Marcher Lordship of Pembroke.

In 1108, the low-lying land of Henry's mother, Flanders, suffered catastrophic flooding, and many of its inhabitantsFlemingssought assistance from Henry. Henry offered to settle the refugees in the hinterland of the Pembroke Lordship - Haverford (the west of the Daugleddau Estuary) and Dungleddy (the east), thus supplementing his garrison at Pembroke Castle with a compliant and grateful local populace; the number of Flemings so settled far outweighed any local Welsh populace (having a significant genetic impact which lasts to this day).

In Dungleddy, the Flemings settled under the leadership of a man named Wizo, who proceeded to build and live at Wiston Castle. Wizo began to grant estates from the land he had been given to his followers, and one such mesne lord was granted the land at Picton, which was three miles to the south of Wiston. This Fleming was not a great historical figure and his name is not recorded. The site chosen for the castle he built may have been on a mound a few hundred yards to the east of the present house, but in any event, the present building was in place by the end of the thirteenth century and was by then in the hands of the Wogan family, who were now the owners of Wiston Castle.

The circumstances under which Picton Castle came to be owned by the Wogans is unclear, but it may have been through a failure to beget male heirs or through the marriage of an heiress to one of the Wogans. As a result of marriage, possibly the same one, the later Wogans also descend from Cadifor ap Collwyn, Lord of Dyfed in the time of Rhys ap Tewdwr; Cadifor (and hence, later Wogans) was male-line descendant of the earlier kings of Dyfed, prior to its amalgamation into Deheubarth by the later House of Dinefwr (from which Rhys ap Tewdwr hailed).

By the 13th century, Wiston Castle seems to have been abandoned and the Wogan family lived at Picton Castle, where their heirs have lived ever since. Picton Castle began as a motte castle and was reconstructed in stone by  Sir John Wogan between 1295 and 1308. The design was unusual, there being no courtyard internally, the main building being protected by seven circular towers which projected from the wall. At the east end, two of these towers acted as a gatehouse, and the portcullised-entrance between them led straight into the lower part of the great hall. At this time the windows were narrow slits but these were replaced in about 1400 by large windows and a grand recessed arch with large window was built in the gatehouse.

In 1405, French troops supporting Owain Glyndŵr attacked and held the Castle, and it was seized again during the English Civil War in 1645 by Parliamentary forces.

In the 15th century, the male-line of Wogans died out. Their heiress, Katherine, married Owen Dunn. Sir Henry Dunn, the grandson of Owen and Katherine, only had daughters. The Picton Castle estate thus came into the hands of the Philipps family when Sir Henry's daughter Jane married Sir Thomas ap Philipps of Cilsant in the 1490s. Sir John Philipps, who inherited the castle in the 15th century, remodelled the building and created a new entrance which remained until the 1820s when a new entrance was designed by Thomas Rowlands (who also designed Slebech Church). In 1611, King James I wanted to pay for his army in Ireland and decided to raise the money by selling baronetcies. Sir John Philipps paid £1,095 for his hereditary title.

The estate remained with the Philipps family until the death of Lord Milford in 1823, when it was inherited by his cousin Richard Grant, who assumed the surname Philipps and was created a Baronet in 1828 and Baron Milford in 1847. His heir was his half-brother, the Reverend James Henry Alexander Philipps (formerly Gwyther), who assumed by royal licence the surname and arms of Philipps. On his death the estate passed to his son-in-law, Charles Edward Gregg Philipps, who was created a Baronet, of Picton, in 1887 (see Philipps baronets) then to Sir Richard Foley Foley-Philipps, cousin of Sir John Erasmus, and grandson of Charles Edward Gregg Philipps.

The estate is now run by the Picton Castle Trust, a Registered Charity. The castle is a Grade I listed building and the walled garden is listed at Grade II. The gardens and park are designated Grade II* on the  Cadw/ICOMOS Register of Parks and Gardens of Special Historic Interest in Wales.

Visitor attractions
Picton Castle is open to visitors for guided tours from spring to autumn and the gardens are open all year round. They extend to about 40 acres and include a walled garden and a Mediterranean garden created in about 1800. There is a restaurant and shop and self-catering accommodation is available in the gatehouse lodges. Events such as exhibitions, fairs and workshops are held periodically and the venue is available for weddings.

Picton Castle is home to the ‘Picton Renoir’ which was featured in BBC's Fake or Fortune? (July 2015). The episode drew attention to differences between art authorities and added to the controversies that have attended the Wildenstein Institute. The painting can be viewed when visiting the castle.

See also
Castles in Great Britain and Ireland
List of castles in England
List of gardens in Wales
Slebech

References

External links

https://www.pictoncastle.co.uk/
Information at Castles of Wales website

Castles in Pembrokeshire
Gardens in Wales
Historic house museums in Wales
Museums in Pembrokeshire
Country houses in Wales
Grade I listed buildings in Pembrokeshire
Registered historic parks and gardens in Pembrokeshire